The Jerry Baker Memorial Velodrome is a  outdoor bicycle racing track located in Redmond, Washington. It was built in 1974 and was resurfaced in 2005. The current track racing surface is 400 meters in total length, with a maximum slope of 23 degrees in the corners. As such, the "Gentle Giant" is one of the longest in the country.  Currently operated by the Marymoor Velodrome Association, the track hosted the US Master's Track National Championships in 2014.

References

Sports venues in Washington (state)
Velodromes in the United States